Yerba Buena Lighthouse is a lighthouse in California, United States, in the San Francisco Bay on Yerba Buena Island, California

History
The island's lighthouse connection began in 1873 when the Lighthouse Service moved the district's depot from Mare Island to the southeast side of Yerba Buena Island. In 1875 construction was completed on the  tower with a fifth order Fresnel lens, brought from the recently decommissioned Yaquina Bay Light in Newport, Oregon.  In 1886 another fifth order lens replaced the previous one.  In 1933, a tunnel was bored through Yerba Buena Island to serve as a link between the east and west sections of the Oakland Bay Bridge. The light was automated by the United States Coast Guard in 1958.  It is currently an active aid to navigation and not open to the public. Now that the lighthouse is automated, the former keeper's quarters are now the home of the Coast Guard Admiral.

Head keepers
 N. D. Tuttle (1875 – 1877)
 Reinhold Holzhuter (1877 – 1880)
 John C. Linné (1881 – 1885)
 George B. Koons (1885 – 1888)
 John A. F. McFarland (1888 – 1892)
 Henry Hall (1892)
 John M. Nilsson (1892 – 1893)
 Richard A. Weiss (1893 – 1904)
 Herbert H. Luff (1904 – 1921)
 John P. Kofod (1921 – 1928)
 Albert N. Speelman (1928 – at least 1935)
 Lemuel C. Miner (at least 1940 – 1943)
 John J. Woyner (1943 – 1944)
 Wayne R. Piland ( – 1946)
 James C. Moore (1946 – 1947)
 Fred Zimmermann (n/a)
 Wayne R. Piland (1953 – 1958)

Gallery

See also

 List of lighthouses in the United States

References

External links

 View of lighthouse from San Francisco, with Bay Bridge detail
 Short film study of the Yerba Buena lighthouse, including interior detail of fresnel lens.

Lighthouses completed in 1875
Lighthouses on the National Register of Historic Places in California
Government buildings on the National Register of Historic Places in San Francisco
Historic districts on the National Register of Historic Places in California
Lighthouses in San Francisco